Nüvədi, Lankaran may refer to:
Aşağı Nüvədi, Azerbaijan
Yuxarı Nüvədi, Azerbaijan